Fichtenholz is a German-language surname literally meaning "Spruce wood". Notable people with this surname include:

 Grigoriy Mikhailovich Fichtenholz (1888, Odessa1959), Ukrainian-born Soviet mathematician
 Mikhail Izrailevich Fichtenholz (1920, Odessa1985), Ukrainian-born Soviet violinist

See also 

German-language surnames
Yiddish-language surnames